Arminia Bielefeld is a German professional football club based in Bielefeld, North Rhine-Westphalia.

This list features all footballers who appeared in at least 50 league matches since 1963.

List of players

Table headers
 Nationality – If a player played international football, the country/countries he played for are shown. Otherwise, the player's nationality is given as their country of birth.
 from, to – The year of the player's first appearance for Arminia Bielefeld and the year of his last appearance.
 Games – The number of games played.
 Goals – The number of goals scored.

References 
 

Arminia Bielefeld
 
Association football player non-biographical articles